Homeyer Verlag Leipzig is a German publishing house in Leipzig and Erfurt, Germany.

A book seller by the late 17th century, publisher of music sheets and later books. Trade, books, and music were the passion of this family.

Variations of the name include Homeyer, Homeier, and Hohmeier.

Book publishing companies of Germany
Publishing companies established in the 17th century
Mass media in Leipzig